is a district located in Tottori Prefecture, Japan.

As of 2003, the district has an estimated population of 25,607 and a density of 102.13 persons per km2. The total area is 250.72 km2.

Towns and villages
Iwami

Merger
On November 1, 2004 the town of Kokufu, and the village of Fukube merged into the city of Tottori.

Districts in Tottori Prefecture